Radisson Blu Perth (formerly known as the Station Hotel) is an historic building in Perth, Perth and Kinross, Scotland. Located on Leonard Street, it is a Category B listed building built in 1888. It opened for business in August 1890. One of the hotel's first managers was Arthur Foster.

The hotel faces Perth railway station, for which it is named. It is also close to Perth bus station. The hotel was formerly owned and managed by the Highland, North British and Caledonian Railway companies.

The building, made of cream and red sandstone, was designed by Perth's city architect Andrew Heiton, who assumed his role some thirty years earlier. He worked with another local architect, John Murray Robertson, on the project. The hotel is a notable example of Scottish baronial architecture.

Queen Victoria was a regular visitor to the hotel. She had breakfast there on her final visit to Perth in May 1900, eight months before her death. She was in a wheelchair on that day.

In 2021, the hotel joined Radisson Hotel Group and became Radisson Blu Perth.

See also
List of listed buildings in Perth, Scotland

References

External links
Official website
Perth, Leonard Street, Station Hotel – Canmore

1888 establishments in Scotland
Listed buildings in Perth, Scotland
Category B listed buildings in Perth and Kinross
Listed hotels in Scotland
Railway hotels in Scotland
Hotels in Perth and Kinross